Karl Neumeister (born 15 August 1913, date of death unknown) was an Austrian equestrian. He competed in the individual eventing at the 1936 Summer Olympics.

References

1913 births
Year of death missing
Austrian male equestrians
Olympic equestrians of Austria
Equestrians at the 1936 Summer Olympics
Place of birth missing